Orson may refer to:

Places

United States
Orson, Iowa, an unincorporated community
Orson, Pennsylvania, a village in Preston Township, Wayne County, Pennsylvania

Fictional places
Orson, Indiana, a small fictional town in the TV series The Middle

People
Orson Bean (1928–2020), American film, television, and stage actor
Orson Flagg Bullard (1834-1906), Pennsylvania state representative
Orson Scott Card (1951–), author of speculative fiction
Orson Squire Fowler (1809–1887), phrenologist who popularized the octagon house
Orson Welles (1915–1985), American director, writer, actor and producer for film, stage, radio and television

Church of Jesus Christ of Latter-day Saints
Orson Pratt (1811–1881) and Orson Hyde (1805–1878), leaders in the Latter-day Saint movement and original members of the Quorum of Twelve Apostles
Orson F. Whitney (1855–1931), politician, journalist, poet, historian and academic, and member of the Quorum of Twelve Apostles
Orson Spencer (1802–1855), prolific writer and prominent member of The Church of Jesus Christ of Latter-day Saints
Orson Pratt Huish (1851–1932), Latter-day Saint hymn writer

Fictional characters
 Orson, the hero of Valentine and Orson, a medieval romance, from which the name originates
Orson Hodge, a fictional character on the ABC television series Desperate Housewives
The unseen supervisor of the alien Mork from planet Ork on the ABC situation comedy Mork & Mindy
Orson Pig, a fictional character on the comic strip U.S. Acres
Orson Pink, a character from Doctor Who
Orson Krennic, a character in the Star Wars franchise film Rogue One
 Orson, the original name for Tweety Bird
 Orson, the main antagonist of the 2022 American 3D-animated film The Ice Age Adventures of Buck Wild.

Other
Orson (band), a former American rock band

See also
 Orso (disambiguation)